Kentucky Route 357 (KY 357) is a north–south state highway that traverses Hart County in south-central Kentucky, and LaRue County in north-central Kentucky.

Route description
KY 357 starts in downtown Munfordville, the Hart County seat, intersecting U.S. Route 31W (US 31W) and KY 88 in town. KY 357 goes in a north-northeasterly path and meets the eastern terminus of KY 728 at Hammonville. KY 357 enters LaRue County and intersects KY 224, and ends at a junction with KY 84 just west of Hodgenville, not too far from the Abraham Lincoln Birthplace.

Major intersections

References

0357
0357
0357